Alessandro Milanese is an Italian motorcycle speedway rider who is a member of Italy's national team. Miotello started at 2008 Italian Grand Prix.

Career details

World Championships 
 Individual Speedway World Championship (Speedway Grand Prix)
 2008 - 34th place (0 points in one event)
 Team World Championship (Speedway World Team Cup and Speedway World Cup)
 2007 - 3rd place in Qualifying round 2
 2008 - 4th place in Qualifying round 2

European Championships 
 Individual European Championship
 2008 - 12th place in Qualifying Round 3
 2009 - 13th place in Semi-Final 1
 European Pairs Championship
 2008 - 6th place in Semi-Final 2
 European Club Champions' Cup
 1999 - 1st place in Group B

Italian Championships 
 Individual Junior Italian Championship
 1988 - Italian Champion

See also 
 Italy national speedway team
 List of Speedway Grand Prix riders

References 

Italian speedway riders

Living people
Year of birth missing (living people)